Parish Episcopal School is a co-educational day school located on two campuses in Dallas, Texas, US. The college preparatory school enrolls students in grades Pre-K–12. In 2015–2016 school year, 1,130 students were enrolled, making Parish the 3rd largest private school in Dallas County.

History
Parish Episcopal School was founded as Parish Day School in 1972, enrolling students between pre-kindergarten through the 6th grade. It was founded by Mary Loving Blair, who served as the first head of school until 1980, when she was re-placed by Gloria Snyder. The school expanded up to grade 12 and was renamed "Parish Episcopal School" in 2001. After adding additional grades, Parish purchased a second campus on the intersection of Midway Road and Alpha Road in Farmers Branch, Texas, which would house students from grades 3 to 12. David Monaco, who was previously at Ravenscroft School in Raleigh, North Carolina, replaced Gloria Snyder as Head of School in 2009. He then resigned in May 2022, and the interim head of school is Michelle Lyon.

Parish graduated its first high school class of approximately 46 students in May 2007; it graduated a second class of 75 students May 2008. From 2003 to 2008, the Upper School grew from 50 students to 380, and from 5 teachers to more than 45.

Academics 
The Upper School offers honors and AP courses. Students are expected to take a course of study which meets the entry requirements of major colleges and universities.

Beginning in eighth grade there is a world religions study which is required. Lower grades take part in religion classes.

Campus life 
The Parish Midway campus is centered around a  academic building designed by an architecture team of I.M. Pei and Henry N. Cobb. A former ExxonMobil office complex, the building in North Dallas was acquired in 2002. A performing arts center was added. The new Upper School includes science labs, a teaching darkroom, Smart Boards in almost all classrooms, world languages labs, and a counseling center. Surrounding this central building are athletic facilities with a gymnasium, playing fields, and a stadium. The Hillcrest campus houses the school's Pre–K through grade 2 program.

Religious life 
In 2012, Episcopal Church of the Transfiguration restructured, giving up ownership of Parish Episcopal School. The decision allowed Parish to maintain accreditation as an independent private school. Parish Episcopal School is now governed by a board of trustees, a percentage of whom are members of the church.

There are daily chapel services and a weekly formal Eucharist service every Thursday. The chapel services at the Hillcrest campus take place in the Church of Transfiguration.

References

External links

Parish Episcopal School website

Educational institutions established in 1972
1972 establishments in Texas
Private K-12 schools in Dallas
Independent Schools Association of the Southwest
Episcopal Church in Texas
Episcopal schools in the United States
ExxonMobil buildings and structures